Julie Frances Christie (born 14 April 1940) is a British actress. An icon of the Swinging Sixties, Christie is the recipient of numerous accolades including an Academy Award, a BAFTA Award, a Golden Globe, and a Screen Actors Guild Award. She has appeared in six films ranked in the British Film Institute's BFI Top 100 British films of the 20th century, and in 1997, she received the BAFTA Fellowship for lifetime achievement.

Christie's breakthrough film role was in Billy Liar (1963). She came to international attention for her performances in Darling (1965), for which she won the Academy Award for Best Actress, and Doctor Zhivago (also 1965), the eighth highest-grossing film of all time after adjustment for inflation. She continued to receive Academy Award nominations, for McCabe & Mrs. Miller (1971), Afterglow (1997) and Away from Her (2007).

In the following years, she starred in Fahrenheit 451 (1966), Far from the Madding Crowd (1967), Petulia (1968), The Go-Between (1971), Don't Look Now (1973), Shampoo (1975), and Heaven Can Wait (1978). She's also known for her performances in the critically acclaimed Hamlet (1996), and Finding Neverland (2004), and the blockbusters Troy and Harry Potter and the Prisoner of Azkaban (both 2004).

Early life
Christie was born on 14 April 1940 at Singlijan Tea Estate, Chabua, Assam, British India. She has a younger brother, Clive, and an older (deceased) half-sister, June, from her father's relationship with an Indian tea picker on his plantation. Her parents separated when Julie was a child, and after their divorce, she spent time with her mother in rural Wales.

She was baptised in the Church of England, and studied as a boarder at the independent Convent of Our Lady school in St Leonards-on-Sea, East Sussex, after being expelled from another convent school for telling a risqué joke that reached a wider audience than she had anticipated. After being asked to leave the Convent of Our Lady as well, she  attended the all-girls Wycombe Court School, High Wycombe, Buckinghamshire, during which time she lived with a foster mother from the age of six. At the Wycombe school, she played the Dauphin in a production of Shaw's Saint Joan. She later studied at the Central School of Speech and Drama.

Career

Early career 
Christie made her professional stage debut in 1957, and her first screen roles were on British television. Her earliest role to gain attention was in BBC serial A for Andromeda (1961). She was a contender for the role of Honey Ryder in the first James Bond film, Dr. No, but producer Albert R. Broccoli reportedly thought her breasts were too small.

1960s 
Christie appeared in two comedies for Independent Artists: Crooks Anonymous and The Fast Lady (both 1962). Her breakthrough role was as Liz, the friend and would-be lover of the eponymous character played by Tom Courtenay in Billy Liar (1963), for which she received a BAFTA Award nomination. The director, John Schlesinger cast Christie only after another actress, Topsy Jane, had dropped out of the film. Christie appeared as Daisy Battles in Young Cassidy (1965), a biopic of Irish playwright Seán O'Casey, co-directed by Jack Cardiff and (uncredited) John Ford.

Her role as an amoral model in Darling (also 1965) led to Christie becoming known internationally. Directed by Schlesinger and co-starring Dirk Bogarde and Laurence Harvey, Christie had only been cast in the lead role after Schlesinger insisted, the studio having wanted Shirley MacLaine. She received the Academy Award for Best Actress and the BAFTA Award for Best British Actress in a Leading Role for her performance.

In David Lean's Doctor Zhivago (also 1965), adapted from the epic/romance novel by Boris Pasternak, Christie's role as Lara Antipova became her best known. The film was a major box-office success. , Doctor Zhivago is the 8th highest-grossing film of all time, adjusted for inflation. According to Life magazine, 1965 was "The Year of Julie Christie".

After dual roles in François Truffaut's adaptation of the Ray Bradbury novel Fahrenheit 451 (1966), starring with Oskar Werner, she appeared as Thomas Hardy's heroine Bathsheba Everdene in Schlesinger's Far from the Madding Crowd (1967). After moving to Los Angeles in 1967 ("I was there because of a lot of American boyfriends"), she appeared in the title role of Richard Lester's Petulia (1968), co-starring with George C. Scott. Christie's persona as the swinging sixties British woman she had embodied in Billy Liar and Darling was further cemented by her appearance in the documentary Tonite Let's All Make Love in London. In 1967, Time magazine said of her: "What Julie Christie wears has more real impact on fashion than all the clothes of the ten best-dressed women combined".

1970s 
In Joseph Losey's romantic drama The Go-Between (1971), Christie had a lead role along with Alan Bates. The film won the Grand Prix, then the main award at the Cannes Film Festival. She earned a second Best Actress Oscar nomination for her role as a brothel madame in Robert Altman's postmodern western McCabe & Mrs. Miller (also 1971). The film was the first of three collaborations between Christie and Warren Beatty, who described her as "the most beautiful and at the same time the most nervous person I had ever known". The couple had a high-profile but intermittent relationship between 1967 and 1974. After the relationship ended, they worked together again in the comedies Shampoo (1975) and Heaven Can Wait (1978).

Her other films during the decade were Nicolas Roeg's thriller Don't Look Now  (1973), based on a story by Daphne du Maurier, in which she co-starred with Donald Sutherland, and the science-fiction/horror film Demon Seed (1977), based on the novel of the same name by Dean Koontz and directed by Donald Cammell. Don't Look Now in particular has received acclaim, with Christie nominated for the BAFTA Award for Best Actress in a Leading Role, and in 2017 a poll of 150 actors, directors, writers, producers and critics for Time Out magazine ranked it the greatest British film ever.

Christie returned to the United Kingdom in 1977, living on a farm in Wales. In 1979, she was a member of the jury at the 29th Berlin International Film Festival. Never a prolific actress, even at the height of her career, Christie turned down many high-profile film roles, including Anne of the Thousand Days, They Shoot Horses, Don't They?, Nicholas and Alexandra, and Reds, all of which earned Oscar nominations for the actresses who eventually played them.

1980s 
In the 1980s, Christie appeared in non-mainstream films such as The Return of the Soldier (1982) and Heat and Dust (1983). She had a major supporting role in Sidney Lumet's Power (1986) alongside Richard Gere and Gene Hackman, but apart from that, she avoided large budget films. She starred in the television film Dadah Is Death (1988), based on the Barlow and Chambers execution, as Barlow's mother Barbara, who desperately fought to save her son from being hanged for drug trafficking in Malaysia.

1990s 
After a lengthy absence from the screen, Christie co-starred in the fantasy adventure film Dragonheart (1996), and appeared as Gertrude in Kenneth Branagh's Hamlet (also 1996). Her next critically acclaimed role was the unhappy wife in Alan Rudolph's domestic comedy-drama Afterglow (1997) with Nick Nolte, Jonny Lee Miller and Lara Flynn Boyle. Christie received a third Oscar nomination for her role. Appearing in six films that were ranked in the British Film Institute's 100 greatest British films of the 20th century, in recognition of her contribution to British cinema Christie received BAFTA's highest honour, the Fellowship in 1997. In 1994, she had been awarded the title Doctor of Letters from the University of Warwick.

21st century 
Christie made a brief cameo appearance in the third Harry Potter film, Harry Potter and the Prisoner of Azkaban (2004), playing Madam Rosmerta. Around the same time, she also appeared in two other high-profile films: Wolfgang Petersen's Troy and Marc Forster's Finding Neverland (both 2004), playing mother to Brad Pitt and Kate Winslet, respectively. The latter performance earned Christie a BAFTA nomination as supporting actress in a film.

Christie portrayed the female lead in Away from Her (2006), a film about a long-married Canadian couple coping with the wife's Alzheimer's disease. Based on the Alice Munro short story "The Bear Came Over the Mountain", the movie was the first feature film directed by Christie's sometime co-star, Canadian actress Sarah Polley. She took the role, she says, only because Polley is her friend. Polley has said Christie liked the script but initially turned it down as she was ambivalent about acting. It took several months of persuasion by Polley before Christie finally accepted the role.

In July 2006 she was a member of the jury at the 28th Moscow International Film Festival. Debuting at the Toronto International Film Festival on 11 September 2006 as part of the TIFF's Gala showcase, Away from Her drew rave reviews from the trade press, including The Hollywood Reporter, and the four Toronto dailies. Critics singled out her performances as well as that of her co-star, Canadian actor Gordon Pinsent, and Polley's direction. Christie's performance generated Oscar buzz, leading the distributor, Lions Gate Entertainment, to buy the film at the festival to release the film in 2007 to build momentum during the awards season.

On 5 December 2007, she won the Best Actress Award from the National Board of Review for her performance in Away from Her. She won the Golden Globe Award for Best Actress - Motion Picture Drama, the Screen Actors Guild Award for Outstanding Performance by a Female Actor in a Leading Role and the Genie Award for Best Actress for the same film. On 22 January 2008, Christie received her fourth Oscar nomination for Best Performance by an Actress in a Leading Role at the 80th Academy Awards. She appeared at the ceremony wearing a pin calling for the closure of the prison in Guantanamo Bay.

Christie narrated Uncontacted Tribes (2008), a short film for the British-based charity Survival International, featuring previously unseen footage of remote and endangered peoples. She has been a long-standing supporter of the charity, and in February 2008, was named as its first 'Ambassador'. She appeared in a segment of the film, New York, I Love You (also 2008), written by Anthony Minghella, directed by Shekhar Kapur and co-starring Shia LaBeouf, as well as in Glorious 39 (2009), about a British family at the start of World War II.

Christie played a "sexy, bohemian" version of the grandmother role in Catherine Hardwicke's gothic retelling of Red Riding Hood (2011). Her most recent role was in the political thriller The Company You Keep (2012), where she co-starred with Robert Redford and Sam Elliott.

Personal life 
In the early 1960s, Christie dated actor Terence Stamp. She had a live-in relationship with Don Bessant, a lithographer and art teacher, from December 1962 to May 1967, before dating actor Warren Beatty for seven on-and-off years (1967–1974). Christie was also linked romantically with musician Brian Eno, record producer Lou Adler, director Jim McBride and photographer Terry O'Neill.

Christie is married to journalist Duncan Campbell; they have lived together since 1979, but the date they married is disputed. In January 2008, several news outlets reported that the couple had quietly married in India two months earlier, in November 2007, which Christie called "nonsense", adding, "I have been married for a few years. Don't believe what you read in the papers."

In the late 1960s, her advisers adopted a very complex scheme in an attempt to reduce her tax liability, giving rise to the leading case of Black Nominees Ltd v Nicol (Inspector of Taxes). The case was heard by Judge Sydney Templeman (who later became Lord Templeman), who gave judgment in favour of the Inland Revenue, ruling that the scheme was ineffective.

She is active in various causes, including animal rights, environmental protection, and the anti-nuclear power movement. She is a Patron of the Palestine Solidarity Campaign, as well as Reprieve, and the CFS/ME charity Action for ME. Christie is a vegetarian.

Acting credits

Films

Television

Theatre
Christie made her professional debut in 1957 at the Frinton Repertory Company in Essex.

Awards and nominations

References

Further reading

External links

 Biography and filmography
 
 
 
 
 

 Interviews
 
 
 Webb, Oliver (23 September 2020) https://www.closelyobservedframes.com/post/an-interview-with-julie-christie. An interview with Julie Christie

1940 births
20th-century English actresses
21st-century English actresses
Living people
Age controversies
Alumni of the Royal Central School of Speech and Drama
Alumni of the Open University
BAFTA fellows
Best Actress Academy Award winners
Best British Actress BAFTA Award winners
Best Drama Actress Golden Globe (film) winners
British anti–nuclear power activists
David di Donatello winners
English environmentalists
English film actresses
English stage actresses
English television actresses
English people of Welsh descent
Best Actress Genie and Canadian Screen Award winners
Independent Spirit Award for Best Female Lead winners
Outstanding Performance by a Female Actor in a Leading Role Screen Actors Guild Award winners
People from Dibrugarh district
ME/CFS activists